Elections in the Free and Hanseatic City of Hamburg (Freie und Hansestadt Hamburg) to its state parliament, the Hamburgische Bürgerschaft, during the Weimar Republic were held at irregular intervals between 1919 and 1932. Results with regard to the percentage of the vote won and the number of seats allocated to each party are presented in the tables below. On 31 March 1933, the sitting Bürgerschaft was dissolved by the Nazi-controlled central government and reconstituted to reflect the distribution of seats in the national Reichstag. The Bürgerschaft subsequently was formally abolished as a result of the "Law on the Reconstruction of the Reich" of 30 January 1934 which replaced the German federal system with a unitary state.

1919

The 1919 Hamburg state election was held on 16 March 1919 to elect the 160 members of the Bürgerschaft.

1921

The 1921 Hamburg state election was held on 20 February 1921 to elect the 160 members of the Bürgerschaft.

1924

The 1924 Hamburg state election was held on 26 October 1924 to elect the 160 members of the Bürgerschaft.

1927

The 1927 Hamburg state election was held on 9 October 1927 to elect the 160 members of the Bürgerschaft.

1928

The 1928 Hamburg state election was held on 19 February 1928 to elect the 160 members of the Bürgerschaft.

1931

The 1931 Hamburg state election was held on 27 September 1931 to elect the 160 members of the Bürgerschaft.

1932

The 1932 Hamburg state election was held on 24 April 1932 to elect the 160 members of the Bürgerschaft.

See also
Elections in Hamburg
Carl Vincent Krogmann
2020 Hamburg state election

References

Elections in the Weimar Republic
Elections in Hamburg
1910s in Hamburg
Hamburg
Hamburg
Hamburg
Hamburg
Hamburg
Hamburg
1920s in Hamburg
1930s in Hamburg

de:Geschichte Hamburgs#Weimarer Republik